Keith Buchanan (born 11 May 1973) is a Unionist politician from Northern Ireland representing the Democratic Unionist Party (DUP). 

Buchanan was elected as a Member of the Legislative Assembly (MLA) for Mid Ulster in 2016.

In November 2021, he was called "disgraceful" by a fellow MLA for attempting to link the Gaelic Athletic Association to dissident Irish republicans. SDLP MLA Justin McNulty accused Buchanan of "stirring up the pot of sectarian tensions".

He has been married to Sandra Buchanan since 1998 and they have one daughter, Loren (born 2003). He is also an active member of the Church of Ireland.

References

1973 births
Living people
Place of birth missing (living people)
Democratic Unionist Party MLAs
Northern Ireland MLAs 2016–2017
Northern Ireland MLAs 2017–2022